Ya-da-villi village is located in Kurnool district of Andhra Pradesh. There is another village in West Godavari district in the same state.

Villages in Kurnool district